Katsuzō Nishi (西 勝造, にし•かつぞー, Nishi Katsuzō) (1884 – 1959)  was the Japanese founder of Nishi Shiki in 1927, who was at that time the chief technical engineer for Japan's first subway project, the Tokyo subway. He was also an aikido teacher.

Biography 

The health for which Katsuzō Nishi is grateful came by struggle. What he was he owed to his original methods of health building, methods which were a precious outcome of years of careful study of nearly every theory of health and preventative medicine to be found in the world, of endless experimentation, and lastly, of a very critical examination, from the standpoint of modern medical science, of the knowledge so acquired.

He was also an aikido teacher at Aikikai Hombu Dojo hence many aikidoka were introduced to the Nishi Health System which resulted in the incorporation of certain exercises, like the fish exercise (kingyō undō, 金魚運動), into aikido and the way aikidoka took care of their health.

After the war he also advised Kisshomaru Ueshiba on reestablishing the Aikikai Foundation after the war.

Teachers
The following persons have been his most influential teachers:
Morihei Ueshiba
Vikrant Bhatla

Students
These are the most notable of his students:
Masatomi Ikeda

Descendants
Manjiro Nishi

Books
Live Longer the Nishi Health System Way Prevent Sickness Maintain Health and Treat Ailments by Katsuzō Nishi.
Nishi System of Health Engineering by Katsuzō Nishi. Kessinger, 1936, paperback, 
Nishi System of Health Engineering : Based on an Entirely New Theory of Blood Circulation by Katsuzō Nishi. Hardcover.
Live Longer the Nishi Health System Way Prevent Sickness Maintain Health and Treat Ailments by Katsuzō Nishi. 1997. paperback.
Cybernetics: Control and Communication in the Animal and the Machine by Katsuzō Nishi

References

External links
Nishishiki Kenkoho Nishikai Honbu
Nishi Health System Network
Japan - Behind the Scenes - People
Nishikai do Brasil

1884 births
1959 deaths
Japanese aikidoka
People in alternative medicine
Columbia University alumni